Murad Mammadov (born 12 August 1995) is an Azerbaijani Greco-Roman wrestler. He is a bronze medalist at the World Wrestling Championships and two-time medalist at the European Wrestling Championships.

Career 

In 2021, he won one of the bronze medals in the 60 kg event at the 2021 World Wrestling Championships held in Oslo, Norway.

He won one of the bronze medals in the 60 kg event at the 2022 European Wrestling Championships held in Budapest, Hungary. A few months later, he won the gold medal in his event at the Matteo Pellicone Ranking Series 2022 held in Rome, Italy. He won the silver medal in his event at the 2021 Islamic Solidarity Games held in Konya, Turkey.

Major results

References

External links
 

1995 births
Living people
Azerbaijani male sport wrestlers
European Wrestling Championships medalists
World Wrestling Championships medalists
Islamic Solidarity Games medalists in wrestling
Islamic Solidarity Games competitors for Azerbaijan
People from Sumgait
20th-century Azerbaijani people
21st-century Azerbaijani people